This is a list of female players who have been named in the national water polo team squad in at least two or three Olympic tournaments since the inaugural official edition in 2000.

Abbreviations

Overall multi-time Olympians
As of 2016, 22 female players have been named in the national water polo team squad in three or more women's Olympic tournaments.

By tournament
The following table is pre-sorted by edition of the Olympics (in ascending order), name of the team (in ascending order), name of the player (in ascending order), respectively. Last updated: 6 February 2021.

Legend and abbreviation
 Team* – Host team

By confederation
Last updated: 24 January 2021.

By team
Last updated: 24 January 2021.

By position
Last updated: 24 January 2021.

Four-time Olympians

Multi-time Olympians by team
The following tables are pre-sorted by number of Olympic appearances (in descending order), year of the last Olympic appearance (in ascending order), year of the first Olympic appearance (in ascending order), date of birth (in ascending order), name of the player (in ascending order), respectively.

Legend
 Year* – As host team

Australia
 Women's national team: 
 Team appearances: 6 (2000*–2020)
 As host team: 2000*
* Number of four-time Olympians: 0
 Number of three-time Olympians: 4
 Last updated: 26 July 2021.

Legend
  – Hosts

Brazil
 Women's national team: 
 Team appearances: 1 (2016*)
 As host team: 2016*
 Number of three-time Olympians: 0
 Number of two-time Olympians: 0
 Last updated: 24 January 2021.

Canada
 Women's national team: 
 Team appearances: 3 (2000–2004, 2020)
 As host team: —
* Number of three-time Olympians: 0
 Number of two-time Olympians: 8
 Last updated: 26 July 2021.

China
 Women's national team: 
 Team appearances: 4 (2008*–2020)
 As host team: 2008*
* Number of four-time Olympians: 0
 Number of three-time Olympians: 3
 Last updated: 26 July 2021.

Legend
  – Hosts

Great Britain
 Women's national team: 
 Team appearances: 1 (2012*)
 As host team: 2012*
 Number of three-time Olympians: 0
 Number of two-time Olympians: 0
 Last updated: 24 January 2021.

Greece
 Women's national team: 
 Team appearances: 2 (2004*–2008)
 As host team: 2004*
* Number of three-time Olympians: 0
 Number of two-time Olympians: 7
 Last updated: 5 May 2021.

Legend
  – Hosts

Hungary
 Women's national team: 
 Team appearances: 5 (2004–2020)
 As host team: —
* Number of four-time Olympians: 0
 Number of three-time Olympians: 2
 Last updated: 26 July 2021.

Note:
 Three-time Olympian Anikó Pelle is listed in section Italy.

Italy
 Women's national team: 
 Team appearances: 4 (2004–2016)
 As host team: —
* Number of five-time Olympians: 0
 Number of four-time Olympians: 1
 Number of three-time Olympians: 3
 Last updated: 24 January 2021.

Abbreviation
 HUN – Hungary
 ITA – Italy

Japan
 Women's national team: 
 Team appearances: 1 (2020*)
 As host team: 2020*
 Number of three-time Olympians: 0
 Number of two-time Olympians: 0
 Last updated: 26 July 2021.

Kazakhstan
 Women's national team: 
 Team appearances: 2 (2000–2004)
 As host team: —
 Number of four-time Olympians: 0
 Number of three-time Olympians: 0
 Last updated: 24 January 2021.

Netherlands
 Women's national team: 
 Team appearances: 3 (2000, 2008, 2020)
 As host team: —
* Number of three-time Olympians: 0
 Number of two-time Olympians: 2
 Last updated: 26 July 2021.

Russia
 Women's national team: 
 Team appearances: 6 (2000–2020)
 As host team: —
* Number of five-time Olympians: 0
 Number of four-time Olympians: 1
 Number of three-time Olympians: 5
 Last updated: 26 July 2021.

South Africa
 Women's national team: 
 Team appearances: 1 (2020*)
 As host team: 2020*
 Number of four-time Olympians: 0
 Number of three-time Olympians: 0
 Last updated: 26 July 2021.

Spain
 Women's national team: 
 Team appearances: 3 (2012–2020)
 As host team: —
* Number of four-time Olympians: 0
 Number of three-time Olympians: 0
 Last updated: 26 July 2021.

United States
 Women's national team: 
 Team appearances: 6 (2000–2020)
 As host team: —
* Number of five-time Olympians: 0
 Number of four-time Olympians: 2
 Number of three-time Olympians: 1
 Last updated: 26 July 2021.

Legend
  – Hosts

See also
 Water polo at the Summer Olympics

 Lists of Olympic water polo records and statistics
 List of men's Olympic water polo tournament records and statistics
 List of women's Olympic water polo tournament records and statistics
 List of Olympic champions in men's water polo
 List of Olympic champions in women's water polo
 National team appearances in the men's Olympic water polo tournament
 National team appearances in the women's Olympic water polo tournament
 List of players who have appeared in multiple men's Olympic water polo tournaments
 List of Olympic medalists in water polo (men)
 List of Olympic medalists in water polo (women)
 List of men's Olympic water polo tournament top goalscorers
 List of women's Olympic water polo tournament top goalscorers
 List of men's Olympic water polo tournament goalkeepers
 List of women's Olympic water polo tournament goalkeepers
 List of Olympic venues in water polo

References

Sources

ISHOF

External links
 Olympic water polo – Official website

Players, Women